Savage's salamander (Bolitoglossa savagei), also known as Savage's mushroomtongue salamander, is a species of salamander in the family Plethodontidae. It is endemic to the Sierra Nevada de Santa Marta in northern Colombia (Magdalena Department). The record from Venezuela represents another species, likely Bolitoglossa guaramacalensis. The species is named after Jay M. Savage, an American herpetologist.

Description
Males measure  and females  in snout–vent length. The tail is slightly shorter or longer than the body. The hands and feet are partially to nearly fully webbed. Colouration is variable, dorsally light or dark brown, with a clear longitudinal band, mottling, or simply uniform.

Habitat and conservation
It primarily lives (and breeds) in arboreal bromeliads, but may sometimes occur in decaying logs and stumps or under decaying leaves. It may co-occur in bromeliads with the frog Pristimantis tayrona.

Habitat loss from deforestation is a threat to this species.

References

Bolitoglossa
Amphibians of Colombia
Endemic fauna of Colombia
Amphibians described in 1963
Taxonomy articles created by Polbot